Al-Fatat Sporting Club Founded in 1975 where a club only dictated to Females, it began playing all kinds of different sports along the Years but officially joined Kuwaiti Women's League in 2017 as an official club, competing in other sports as well.

See also

Kuwaiti Women's League
VIVA Premier League

References

External links

Fatat
Fatat
Fatat
Fatat
Fatat
Fatat
Fatat